Sucker Punch is a play by the award-winning British playwright Roy Williams. It was first staged in 2010 at the Royal Court Theatre in London. The play was nominated for the Evening Standard Award and the Olivier Award for Best New Play.

Plot
Set in a run-down London boxing ring in the 1980s, two young black boys, Leon and Troy, are trained by a white trainer, Charlie, who had seen their potential. Troy soon rebels and is ejected from the gym by Charlie; he moves to the United States where he gains a boxing reputation. Charlie's daughter and Leon begin an affair, but when Charlie discovers this he objects at the idea of his daughter associating with a black man, forcing Leon to choose between training and his daughter. Leon leaves her and attempts to ingratiate himself with the white community to the fury of his family. Later, Troy returns with a fake American accent and a manipulative new manager; he and Leon are forced to fight.

Cast
Gary Beadle
Daniel Kaluuya
Trevor Laird
Nigel Lindsay
Jason Maza
Sarah Ridgeway
Anthony Welsh

Premiere
The play, staged in 2010 at the Royal Court's  Jerwood Theatre Downstairs in London, was directed by Sacha Wares. It received positive reviews with particular attention drawn to the young star Daniel Kaluuya who won both the 2010 Critics Circle and Evening Standard Award for Outstanding Newcomer. The play also starred Anthony Welsh, Gary Beadle, Nigel Lindsay, Trevor Laird, Jason Maza and Sarah Ridgeway. The play's set, where the downstairs theatre was converted into a boxing ring, was designed by Miriam Buether who won the Evening Standard Award 2010 for Best Designer. Leon Baugh's  choreography for the play won him the Olivier Award for Best Theatre Choreographer.

Williams won the 2010 Alfred Fagon Award, his second, for the play.

References

2010 plays
English plays
Fiction set in the 1980s
Plays set in London
Plays about race and ethnicity